Nomad Foods is an American-British frozen foods company, with its headquarters in the United Kingdom. The company's jurisdiction of incorporation is the British Virgin Islands. In 2015, Nomad acquired the Iglo Group. Five countries – the UK, Italy, Germany, France and Sweden – accounted for a combined 75% of its total sales in 2016.

History 
Nomad Foods was founded on 1 April 2014 as an investment vehicle without operational business by Noam Gottesman and Martin E. Franklin. Its shares were listed on the London Stock Exchange. On 20 April 2015, Nomad Holding announced it would acquire the Iglo Group (with its brands Iglo, Birds Eye and Findus in Italy), based in Feltham, London, England, from Permira for €2.6 billion. On 1 July 2015 Nomad Holdings completed the acquisition and renamed itself to Nomad Foods. Permira holds a 9 percent stake in the new company.

Nomad subsequently purchased the Findus Group in November 2015. The acquisition meant Findus' operations in Italy owned by Iglo were reunited with those in the rest of continental Europe and Scandinavia under the same ownership.

In January 2016, the company moved its listing from the London Stock Exchange to the New York Stock Exchange.

In April 2018, Nomad Foods completed its purchase of Goodfella's Pizza, previously owned by Two Sisters Foods Group, for EUR225 million, and in June 2018, it agreed to acquire British frozen food maker Aunt Bessie's for €280 million.

In January 2021, Nomad Foods went into exclusive talks with Fortenova Grupa over their frozen food business, which includes Ledo Plus from Croatia, Ledo Citluk from Bosnia and Frikom from Serbia. The transaction has been completed in September 2021 at about €615 million.

References

External links 
 

Multinational food companies
Food manufacturers of the United Kingdom
Companies listed on the London Stock Exchange
Manufacturing companies established in 2014
Food and drink companies established in 2014
2014 establishments in the British Virgin Islands